The 1949–50 Baltimore Bullets season was the first season of the Maryland club in the newly formed National Basketball Association. Coming from two successful seasons in the BAA, including a championship run, this time their 25-43 record would not be sufficient for them to reach the division playoffs. Another change from the previous year was president Robert "Jake" Embry's decision not to televise the Bullets' games. The club would change hands towards the end of the season, to a group of local businessmen.

Draft

Roster
{| class="toccolours" style="font-size: 95%; width: 100%;"
|-
! colspan="2" style="background-color: #0047AB;  color: #FFFFFF; text-align: center;" | Baltimore Bullets 1949–50 roster
|- style="background-color: #FFFFFF; color: #0047AB;   text-align: center;"
! Players !! Coaches
|- 
| valign="top" |
{| class="sortable" style="background:transparent; margin:0px; width:110%;"
! Pos. !! # !! Nat. !! Name !! Ht. !! Wt. !! From
|-

Pre-season

Regular season

Season standings

Record vs. opponents

Game log

Player statistics

Season

Statistics with the Baltimore Bullets

Transactions

Trades

References

Baltimore Bullets (1944–1954) seasons
Baltimore